Arthur Walsh may refer to:
Arthur Walsh, 2nd Baron Ormathwaite (1827–1920)
Arthur Walsh, 3rd Baron Ormathwaite (1859–1937), British courtier
Arthur Walsh (U.S. Senator) (1896–1947), American politician from New Jersey
A. D. Walsh (1916–1977), British chemist
Arthur Walsh (actor) (1923–1995), Canadian actor and dancer

See also
Arthur Welsh (disambiguation)